The Asian Football Confederation's 1983 AFC Women's Championship was the fifth AFC Women's Championship. It was held from April 1983 in Thailand. Participating members were Thailand, India, Malaysia, Singapore, Hong Kong, Philippines. The tournament was won by Thailand in the final against India.

Japan and Taiwan were expected to play but withdrew on short notice.

Format
Eight nations were willing to take part; there was a draw with two groups. One group consisted of Singapore, Malaysia, Japan and Taiwan, the other of Hong Kong, India, Thailand and Philippines.

After Taiwan and Japan withdrew from the tournament, the six remaining teams were put in a single group and played a single round-robin tournament.

Group stage

Knockout stage

Third place play-off

Final

Winner

References

External links 
 RSSSF.com

Women's Championship
AFC Women's Asian Cup tournaments
International association football competitions hosted by Thailand
Afc
AFC Championship
AFC Women's Championship
AFC Women's Championship